The Tracks Across America Tour '82 was a concert tour by the American band Blondie in 1982. The tour supported their latest album, The Hunter (the first tour since their European Tour in 1979-'80) and would be Blondie's last tour before disbanding in late 1982. The band would reconvene in the late 1990s.

Background
Though the tour nominally supported the album The Hunter, songs from Autoamerican (1980) also saw their first live performances as the band had not toured in support of that album. The non-album hit single "Call Me" and Debbie Harry's solo track "Chrome" were also performed live for the first time.

For the tour, guitarist Frank Infante was replaced with a session musician Eddie Martinez due to Infante's conflicting relationship with other band members. The tour also featured a horn section performing with the band.

Originally, the tour was supposed to have two legs, the second being in Europe with 41 dates in total, but the second leg was cancelled after slow ticket sales. Only 19 of the concerts (all in North America) were performed.

The show at the Exhibition Stadium in Toronto, Ontario, Canada, which took place an 18 August 1982, was recorded and filmed for the broadcast on HBO. Since then, it has been released several times as a semi-official live album and on video (both on VHS and DVD).

The tour turned out to be unsuccessful for Blondie with shows taking place at half-empty venues. Guitarist Chris Stein's health had been worsening during the tour. He was rapidly losing weight and shortly after the tour ended was diagnosed with pemphigus vulgaris, a rare autoimmune disease. Shortly afterwards, Blondie disbanded. They would not have any further live performances until a series of reunion concerts in 1997 and 1998.

Opening acts
 Duran Duran (August 2–18; Duran Duran did not appear with Blondie at John F. Kennedy Stadium in Philadelphia on August 21.  Blondie were third on the bill of an all-day stadium show.  The line-up that day consisted of Robert Hazard and the Heroes, A Flock of Seagulls, Blondie, Elvis Costello and the Attractions, and Genesis.)

Personnel
Blondie
 Debbie Harry – vocals
 Chris Stein – guitar
 Clem Burke – drums
 Jimmy Destri – keyboards
 Nigel Harrison – bass
Additional musicians
 Eddie Martinez – guitar
 Abel Domingues – keyboards
 Douglas Harris – horns
 Joseph Kohanski – horns
 Arthur Pugh – horns

Setlist

Tour dates

Cancelled Shows

References 

Blondie (band) concert tours
1982 concert tours